The 2019–20 Biathlon World Cup – Sprint Women started on 1 December 2019 in Östersund and will finished on 13 March 2020 in Kontiolahti. The defending champion Anastasiya Kuzmina retired after the 2018-19 season.

Competition format
The  sprint race is the third oldest biathlon event; the distance is skied over three laps. The biathlete shoots two times at any shooting lane, first prone, then standing, totalling 10 targets. Competitors' starts are staggered, normally by 30 seconds.

2018–19 Top 3 standings

Medal winners

Standings

References

Sprint Women